That '80s Show is an American television sitcom set in 1984 that aired from January to May 2002 on Fox.

Even though it had a similar name, show structure, and many of the same writers and production staff, it was not a direct spin-off of That '70s Show. The characters and storylines from the two shows never crossed paths. It was a separate decade-based show created as a result of That '70s Shows popularity at the time. The show was cancelled after 13 episodes.

Development
Freaks and Geeks, a show that aired on NBC during the 1999–2000 television season, was called That '80s Show by fans and critics for its similarities to That '70s Show. When asked about That '70s Show entering the 1980s, after Fox renewed the show for seasons three and four in December 1999, show creator Mark Brazill said "we'll have to change the name to That '80s Show."

That '80s Show began development by August 2001, using the same creative team from That '70s Show. Fox wanted to do a spin-off of That '70s Show, but moved ahead with a show about a different decade. In November 2001, Fox announced That '80s Show would premiere on January 23, 2002, as a midseason replacement. In developing the show, executive producer Linda Wallem said "This show really came out of conversations we had while working on 'That '70s Show.' We were talking about what we had been doing in the '80s and found that we had all been in pretty much the same situation, supporting ourselves with jobs we hated but really burning to be in show business. But, of course, for most people, the '80s were all about going out and getting your share of the money pie, so our characters are people who constantly are being pulled between their artistic dreams and commercial reality." Wallem, along with Mark Brazill and Terry Turner, created the show, and other executive producers included Marcy Carsey and Tom Werner. The costume designer, Melina Root, who also worked on That '70s Show, researched fashion magazines, merchandising catalogs, and yearbooks from the 1980s to find ideas for clothing the characters on the show could wear.

Stand-up comic Margaret Smith was cast for That '80s Show in October 2001. Fox announced the rest of the cast (Chyler Leigh, Brittany Daniel, Glenn Howerton, Tinsley Grimes, and Eddie Shin) in December 2001. The show cast relatively unknown actors similarly to the cast of That '70s Show. Daniel, who portrayed Sophia in That '80s Show, had a guest starring role on That 70s Show in an episode that aired the day before That 80s Show premiered. She played Eric Forman's cousin Penny in the episode "Eric's Hot Cousin". Howerton and Grimes grew up in Montgomery, Alabama, at the same time, but had not met before being cast as siblings on the show.

It debuted January 23, 2002, and the final episode aired May 29, 2002. Its regular time slot was on Wednesday nights at 8:00/7:00 Central on the Fox Network.

Plot 
The show is set in 1984 and revolves around the lives of a group of friends in their 20s living in San Diego, California. The show follows the lives of struggling musician Corey Howard and his associates, friends, and family. His working (and eventual romantic) relationship with June Tuesday is also a focal point, and becomes the main anchor of the show after a few episodes. Later episodes focused on the culture clash between Corey and June's lifestyles. Various tidbits of 1980s culture and music are sprinkled in throughout each episode. As with That '70s Show, several celebrities from the decade guest starred in several episodes.

Episodes took place at different locations throughout the day. Scenes would take place at Club Berlin, a dance club; Permanent Record, the record store where Corey and June worked; Videx, an office owned by R. T.; and the family home, along with the occasional car trip.

The theme song is a 15-second snippet of "Eighties" by Killing Joke, with the opening credit sequence (and screens used to transition from scene to scene) consisting of a hand flipping through a row of vinyl records, each with artwork of a cast member's face and name.

Cast

Main 
 Glenn Howerton as Corey Howard, a struggling musician who lives at home with his sister Katie and his father R. T. Howard works at Permanent Record, a record store. He also dated Sophia before the start of the series, as they are recently broken up in the pilot.
 Tinsley Grimes as Katie Howard, Corey's sister. A Valley Girl and college drop-out turned environmentalist.
 Chyler Leigh as June Tuesday, a punk-rocker who also works at Permanent Record. Leigh said it took about 35 minutes and "nine pounds of hairspray" for her hair stylist to create Tuesday's Liberty spikes hair for each day of filming.
 Eddie Shin as Roger Park, Corey's best friend, a struggling used-car dealer and wannabe yuppie like R. T. He rents a room above the Howard family garage, admires Ronald Reagan and is a dance enthusiast.
 Brittany Daniel as Sophia, Corey's bisexual ex-girlfriend who has an unrequited crush on Corey's sister Katie.
 Margaret Smith as Margaret, an ex-Hippie/Rock Groupie and owner of Permanent Record, the record store where Corey and Tuesday work.
 Geoff Pierson as R. T. Howard, Corey and Katie's divorced father and owner of "Videx", a small company that produces and sells personal fitness equipment such as the Butt Luge and the Gut Wacker.

Episodes

Reception

Critical
The first episode of That '80s Show received generally negative reviews from television critics. Eric Kohanik of The Calgary Herald lamented that a time period needs to be at least 20 years away to laugh at it, and That '80s Show was created too soon. David Bianculli from The New York Daily News agreed, yet summed up that the show "isn't that bad." Josh Friedman of The Los Angeles Times concluded that the pilot was reminiscent of a school reunion, that "[t]he nostalgic fun is intermittent".  Miki Turner from the Fort Worth Star-Telegram criticized the chemistry of the cast and the effectiveness of the writing. Sonia Mansfield from The San Francisco Examiner said the show "is mildly entertaining with a few funny moments", but pointed out that the humor was being pushed by the setting rather than through its characters. In a more negative review, Peggy Curran from The Montreal Gazette said it is "nowhere near as funny or original as it could have been."

In a retrospective column, Tony Atherton of The Ottawa Citizen explained that one of the reasons That '80s Show failed was because the show featured young adults in the 1980s, and those who experienced that decade in their 20s would be in their 40s when the show aired in 2002. He mused that the show targeted viewers in their early 30s, but made their cast of characters too old.

Ratings
The premiere episode of That '80s Show on January 23, 2002, garnered 11.40 million viewers, placing the show 41st overall for television programs during the week.

For the 2001–02 television season, That '80s Show was ranked 104th in average viewership by Nielsen and received 6.8 million average viewers per episode.

Cancellation
That '80s Show failed to gain a wide audience during its original run, and low ratings eventually caused Fox to cancel it after 13 episodes on May 17, 2002, before the final episode aired on May 29.

References

External links 
 Carsey-Werner - That '80s Show
 

2002 American television series debuts
2002 American television series endings
2000s American teen sitcoms
English-language television shows
Fox Broadcasting Company original programming
Television series by Carsey-Werner Productions
Television series set in 1984
Television series set in the 1980s
Television shows set in San Diego
Television series created by Bonnie and Terry Turner
Nostalgia television shows
Nostalgia television in the United States
Television series created by Mark Brazill
Television series created by Linda Wallem
That '70s Show